Jamiołki-Godzieby is a village in the administrative district of Gmina Sokoły, within Wysokie Mazowieckie County, Podlaskie Voivodeship, in north-eastern Poland.

The village has a population of 50.

References

Villages in Wysokie Mazowieckie County